Epilepia melanosparsalis is a species of snout moth in the genus Epilepia. It was described by Anthonie Johannes Theodorus Janse in 1922 and is known from South Africa and Zimbabwe.

References

Epipaschiinae
Lepidoptera of South Africa
Lepidoptera of Zimbabwe
Moths of Sub-Saharan Africa
Moths described in 1922